Artificial duck may refer to:

 Duck decoy (model), an object resembling a duck used in hunting to attract real ducks
 Mock duck, a gluten-based vegetarian food intended to appear and taste like duck meat